Ray Vaughn (born 1948) is an American politician. He served as a Republican member for the 81st district of the Oklahoma House of Representatives.

Life and career 
Vaughn attended Oklahoma Christian University and Oklahoma City University School of Law.

In 1989, Vaughn was elected to represent the 81st district of the Oklahoma House of Representatives, succeeding Gaylon Stacey. He served until 2004, when he was succeeded by Ken A. Miller.

Vaughn was a commissioner in Oklahoma City, Oklahoma for the 3rd district. He served until 2019, when he was succeeded by Kevin Calvey.

References 

1948 births
Living people
Place of birth missing (living people)
Republican Party members of the Oklahoma House of Representatives
20th-century American politicians
21st-century American politicians
20th-century Members of the Oklahoma House of Representatives
Oklahoma Christian University alumni
Oklahoma City University School of Law alumni